Omorgus funestus is a species of hide beetle in the subfamily Omorginae and subgenus Afromorgus.

References

funestus
Beetles described in 1886